Oforikrom is one of the constituencies represented in the Parliament of Ghana. It elects one Member of Parliament (MP) by the first past the post system of election

Emmanuel Marfo and currently a member of the Eighth Parliament of the Fourth Republic of Ghana representing the Oforikrom Constituency in the Ashanti Region of Ghana on the ticket of the New Patriotic Party

References 

Parliamentary constituencies in the Ashanti Region